Master of Light is the ninth full-length album by the German power metal band Freedom Call. It was released on November 11, 2016, by SPV.

Track listing

Personnel
Chris Bay – vocals, guitar
Lars Rettkowitz – rhythm guitar
Ilker Ersin – bass guitar
Ramy Ali – drums

References

External links
 Official website of Freedom Call

2016 albums
Freedom Call albums
SPV/Steamhammer albums